Aji Chay or Talkheh Rud (Talkheh Rud, both meaning "bitter river") is a river in Azerbaijan region of Iran. Most of it is in the East Azerbaijan Province.

Its water is alkali due to passing from the lands with high mineralization. It is the largest river that discharges into Lake Urmia. It arises above Sarab from the slopes of Mount Bozgush and Mount Sabalan. Its tributary, the sweet water Quri Chay, joins the Aji just north-east of central Tabriz.

The Iranian government has a project under development to put the water to agricultural use by altering the watercourse of the Talkheh-Roud away from the alkali lands. As part of this project, the Madani dam is being constructed on the Talkheh-Roud on the north-east side of Eynali mountain, which lies to the north-east of Tabriz.

The historic Aji Chay Bridge over the river, on the old Tabriz road to Marand, is just outside Tabriz and east of the Tabriz International Airport.

See also 
Mehraneh roud

Notes

Rivers of Tabriz
Landforms of East Azerbaijan Province